Lotta på Bråkmakargatan is a Swedish film which was released to cinemas in Sweden on 26 September 1992, based on the books by Astrid Lindgren, directed by Johanna Hald. It was followed by Lotta flyttar hemifrån.

Selected cast
Grete Havnesköld as Lotta
Linn Gloppestad as Mia
Martin Andersson as Jonas
Beatrice Järås as Doris (Lotta's mother)
Claes Malmberg as Stephen (Lotta's father)
Margreth Weivers as Mrs. Berg
Ulla Lopez as Baker's wife
Klas Dykhoff as Chimney sweep
Rune Turesson as Lotta's grandfather
Else-Marie Sundin as Lotta's grandmother
Alice Braun as Majken
Anna Nyman as Woman
Claes Månsson as Conductor

References

External links 

1990s Swedish-language films
1992 films
Films based on works by Astrid Lindgren
Swedish comedy films
Films directed by Johanna Hald
Swedish children's films
1990s Swedish films